Ctenucha rubrovenata is a moth of the family Erebidae.

References

rubrovenata
Moths described in 1912